Welson Sim Wee Sheng (born 29 March 1997) is a Malaysian professional swimmer. He was the first Malaysian male swimmer to qualify for the men's 400 metre freestyle event at the 2016 Summer Olympics.

Early and personal life
Sim was born in Kuching, Sarawak to Lee Ngiat Kim and Sim Ah Tee. He started joining swimming classes at the age of 10 to overcome childhood asthma, and competed in Sarawak's President Cup a year later. By the time he turned 12, he was in the Sarawak state swimming team. Sim attended Batu Lintang National Secondary School, before transferring to Bukit Jalil Sports School during the mid-semester in Form Three.

In March 2021, Sim involved in a motorcycle accident, resulting in a broken arm and had two pins inserted into his left arm.

References

External links
 

1997 births
Living people
People from Sarawak
Malaysian sportspeople of Chinese descent
Malaysian male freestyle swimmers
Olympic swimmers of Malaysia
Swimmers at the 2016 Summer Olympics
Swimmers at the 2020 Summer Olympics
Swimmers at the 2014 Summer Youth Olympics
Swimmers at the 2014 Asian Games
Swimmers at the 2014 Commonwealth Games
Southeast Asian Games medalists in swimming
Southeast Asian Games gold medalists for Malaysia
Southeast Asian Games silver medalists for Malaysia
Southeast Asian Games bronze medalists for Malaysia
Swimmers at the 2018 Asian Games
Competitors at the 2013 Southeast Asian Games
Competitors at the 2015 Southeast Asian Games
Competitors at the 2017 Southeast Asian Games
Competitors at the 2019 Southeast Asian Games
Asian Games competitors for Malaysia
Commonwealth Games competitors for Malaysia
Competitors at the 2021 Southeast Asian Games
20th-century Malaysian people
21st-century Malaysian people